The 2002–03 Ekstraklasa is the 77th season of the Polish Football Championship and the 69th season of the Ekstraklasa, the top Polish professional league for association football clubs, since its establishment in 1927.

Overview
16 teams competed in the 2002-03 season. Wisła Kraków won the championship.

League table

Results

Relegation playoffs
The matches were played on 14, 15, 21 and 22 June 2003.

Top goalscorers

References

Ekstraklasa seasons
Poland
1